The Agwei River or the River Agwei, also spelled Agvey, is a tributary of the Pibor River that flows through eastern South Sudan. Its own tributaries include the Abara and Kongkong rivers. The river is a wadi, or ravine, that may run dry during the dry season but quickly becomes a watercourse due to heavy rainfall during the wet season.

External links 
Map of Jonglei
River Agwei

Rivers of South Sudan
Jonglei State
Greater Upper Nile
Nile basin
Sobat River